VA252 may refer to:
 Ariane flight VA252, an Ariane 5 launch that occurred on 18 February 2020
 Virgin Australia flight 252, with IATA flight number VA252
 Virginia State Route 252 (SR 252 or VA-252), a primary state highway in the United States